The Klusenberg is, at , the highest elevation on the territory of the city of Dortmund.

The Klusenberg part of the Ardey Hills lies west of the Hohensyburg. To the south its slopes fall away into the Hengsteysee lake. The Klusenberg is wooded with just a few residential houses.

References 

Dortmund
Mountains and hills of North Rhine-Westphalia
Mountains and hills of the Rhenish Massif